Domine Non Es Dignus is the second studio album by British extreme metal group Anaal Nathrakh. It was released on 2 November 2004. The title translates to "Lord, you are not worthy" in Latin.

Background
The title "Rage, Rage Against the Dying of the Light" comes from the Dylan Thomas poem "Do not go gentle into that good night". The album features sound samples from films such as Hellraiser ("Revaluation of All Values …") and 1984 ("Do Not Speak"). The title "Procreation of the Wretched" is a tribute to Celtic Frost and their track "Procreation of the Wicked". The title "Revaluation of All Values …" is in reference to the transvaluation of all values (Umwertung aller Werte), a central concept in the philosophical project of German philosopher Friedrich Nietzsche, which includes reevaluating humility and poverty as being virtuous in value systems such as Christianity.

Track listing

Personnel
V.I.T.R.I.O.L. – vocals
Irrumator – all instruments
Ventnor – guitar, vocals
Paul F – vomit

References

2004 albums
Anaal Nathrakh albums
Season of Mist albums